Bukit Petaling is a location in Kuala Lumpur, Malaysia and is the site of the Istana Negara, or National Palace of Malaysia. Jalan Istana and Jalan Syed Putra are the two major roads servicing this area.

Suburbs in Kuala Lumpur